3688 Navajo, provisional designation , is a Griqua asteroid and a 2:1 Jupiter librator on an eccentric, cometary-like orbit from the outermost regions of the asteroid belt, approximately  in diameter. It was discovered on 30 March 1981, by American astronomer Edward Bowell at the Anderson Mesa Station near Flagstaff, Arizona. The dark P-type asteroid was named for the Native American Navajo people.

Orbit and classification 

Navajo is an asteroid in a cometary orbit (ACO), with no observable coma but with a Tisserand's parameter just below the defined the threshold of 3.0. ACO's may be extinct comets. It is a member of the small dynamical Griqua group, a marginally unstable group of asteroids observed in the Hecuba gap, a 2:1 resonant zone with the gas giant Jupiter. The group is named after its largest member, 1362 Griqua.

Navajo is a non-family asteroid from the main belt's background population. It orbits the Sun in the outermost asteroid belt at a distance of 1.7–4.8 AU once every 5 years and 9 months (2,112 days; semi-major axis of 3.22 AU). Its orbit has a high eccentricity of 0.48 and an inclination of 3° with respect to the ecliptic. The body's observation arc begins with a precovery taken at Siding Spring Observatory, just weeks before its official discovery observation at Anderson Mesa.

Physical characteristics 

Navajo has been characterized as a dark and primitive P-type asteroid. It has an absolute magnitude of 15.1. As of 2018, no rotational lightcurve of Navajo has been obtained from photometric observations. The body's rotation period, pole and shape remain unknown.

Diameter and albedo 

According to the survey carried out by the NEOWISE mission of NASA's Wide-field Infrared Survey Explorer, Navajo measures 6.086 kilometers in diameter and its surface has an albedo of 0.047.

Naming 

This minor planet was named after the indigenous North American Navajo people, inhabitants of Arizona, New Mexico and Utah in the Southwestern United States. The official naming citation was published by the Minor Planet Center on 2 April 1988.

References

External links 
 Asteroids in Cometary Orbits (ACOs), Instituto de Astrofísica de Canarias
 Dictionary of Minor Planet Names, Google books
 Discovery Circumstances: Numbered Minor Planets (1)-(5000) – Minor Planet Center
 
 

003688
003688
Discoveries by Edward L. G. Bowell
Named minor planets
19810330